Robert James "Bob" Chinnock (born 3 July 1943) is a New Zealand-born Australian botanist who worked at the State Herbarium of South Australia as a senior biologist. He retired in 2008 but still works as an honorary research associate.

His research interests include Eremophila and related genera, the weedy Cactaceae, especially those in the genus Opuntia, and Australian ferns and clubmosses.

His PhD thesis at Flinders University in 1982 was focused upon Myoporaceae,

He is the author of Eremophila and allied genera : a monograph of the plant  family Myoporaceae. (Plants in these genera are now included in the family Scrophulariaceae.)

References

External links

1943 births
Living people
Victoria University of Wellington alumni
Flinders University alumni
People from Wellington City
New Zealand emigrants to Australia
Place of birth missing (living people)
Australian Botanical Liaison Officers